Gu Li is the name of:

Gu Li (Han dynasty) (fl. 214–226), officer under the warlord Sun Quan during the Han and Eastern Wu dynasties
Gu Li (Go player) (born 1983), Chinese Go player
Gu Li, a major character in the Tiny Times (franchise)

See also
Gul (name), a common name among Turkic people in western China, where it's also transliterated as "Gu Li" 
Li Gu (disambiguation) — for people with the surname Li
Guli (disambiguation)